The Frank was the currency of the Swiss canton of Uri between 1798 and 1850. It was subdivided into 10 Batzen, each of 10 Rappen. It was worth th the French silver écu or 6.67 g fine silver.

History

The Frank was the currency of the Helvetian Republic from 1798. The Helvetian Republic ceased issuing coins in 1803. Uri issued coins in 1811. In 1850, the Swiss franc was introduced, with 1 Uri Frank = 1.4597 Swiss francs.

Coins
Billon coins were issued in denominations of 1 Rappen,  and 1 Batzen, with silver coins for 2 and 4 Batzen.

References

External links
 

Modern obsolete currencies
Currencies of Switzerland
1810s establishments in Switzerland
1850 disestablishments in Switzerland
Canton of Uri